

Awards and nominations

American Music Awards

|-
| 2007
| The White Stripes
| Favorite Alternative Artist
|

Anty Radio Awards 

|-
| 2018
| Jack White
| Best International Vocalist
|

Best Art Vinyl

|-
| 2022
|Entering Heaven Alive Cover Art (Jack White)
| Best Art Vinyl
|

Brit Awards

|-
| rowspan="2" | 2003
| rowspan="2" | The White Stripes
| International Breakthrough Act
| 
|-
| International Group
| 
|-
| rowspan="2" | 2004
| Elephant (The White Stripes)
| International Album
| 
|-
| rowspan="2"|The White Stripes
| rowspan="2"|International Group
| 
|-
| 2006
| 
|-
| 2007
| The Raconteurs
| International Breakthrough Act
| 
|-
| 2008
| The White Stripes
| International Group
| 
|-
| 2013
| rowspan="2"|Jack White
| rowspan="2"|International Male Solo Artist
| 
|-
| 2015
|

British Academy Film Awards

|-
| 2004
| Cold Mountain (with Various Artists)
| Best Film Music
|

Clio Awards

|-
| 2022
| "Taking Me Back" Cover Art (Jack White) 
| Music Marketing - Packaging
|

Critics' Choice Movie Awards

|-
| 2008
| "Another Way To Die" (Jack White and Alicia Keys)
| Best Song
|

Country Music Awards

|-
| 2009
| "Old Enough" (The Raconteurs)
| Musical Event of the Year
|

Cypress Music Academy

|-
| rowspan="2"| 2002
| "Seven Nation Army" (The White Stripes)
| Song of the Year
| 
|-
| The White Stripes
| Best Group
|

Detroit Music Award

|-
| 2001
| The White Stripes
| Outstanding Alternative Artist
| 
|-
| rowspan="2"| 2002
|White Blood Cells (The White Stripes)
| Outstanding National Album
| 
|-
| "Hotel Yorba" (The White Stripes)
| Outstanding National Single
| 
|-
| rowspan="2"| 2004
|Elephant (The White Stripes)
| Outstanding National Major Label Recording
| 
|-
| "Seven Nation Army" (The White Stripes)
| Outstanding National Single
| 
|-
| 2005
| "Black Math" video (The White Stripes)
| Outstanding Video/Major Budget
| 
|-
| 2008
| "Icky Thump" (The White Stripes)
| Outstanding National Single
| 
|-
| rowspan="3"| 2009
| "Consolers of the Lonely" (The Raconteurs)
| Outstanding Major Label Recording
| 
|-
| "Consoler of the Lonely" (The Raconteurs)
| Outstanding National Single
| 
|-
| "Another Way To Die" (Jack White and Alicia Keys)
| Outstanding National Single
| 
|-
| 2011
| "Under Great White Northern Lights" (The White Stripes)
| Outstanding National Major Label Recording
| 
|-
| rowspan="5"| 2013
| Blunderbuss (Jack White)
| Outstanding National Major Label Distribution Album
| 
|-
| rowspan="2"| "Freedom at 21" (Jack White)
| Outstanding National Single
| 
|-
| Outstanding Video / Major Budget 
| 
|-
| rowspan="2"| "Love Interruption" (Jack White)
| Outstanding National Single
| 
|-
| Outstanding Video / Major Budget 
|

Emmy Awards

|-
| 2017
| The American Epic Sessions (Bernard MacMahon, Duke Erikson, Jack White and T Bone Burnett)
| Outstanding Music Direction
|

Grammy Awards

|-
| style="text-align:center;" rowspan="4"| 2004 ||style="text-align:left;" rowspan="2"|Elephant (The White Stripes)|| Best Alternative Music Album || 
|-
| Album of the Year || 
|-
|style="text-align:left;" rowspan="2"|"Seven Nation Army" (The White Stripes)|| Best Rock Song || 
|-
| Best Rock Performance by a Duo or Group with Vocal || 
|-
| style="text-align:center;" rowspan="4"| 2005 ||style="text-align:left;" rowspan="2"|"Portland Oregon" (Jack White with Loretta Lynn) || Best Country Collaboration with Vocals || 
|-
| Best Country Song || 
|-
|style="text-align:left;" rowspan="1"|Cold Mountain (Jack White with Various Artists)|| Best Compilation Soundtrack for Visual Media || 
|-
|style="text-align:left;" rowspan="1"|Van Lear Rose (Loretta Lynn, Produced by Jack White)|| Best Country Album || 
|-
|style="text-align:center;" rowspan="2"| 2006 || Get Behind Me Satan (The White Stripes)|| Best Alternative Music Album || 
|-
| "My Doorbell" (The White Stripes)|| Best Pop Performance by a Duo or Group with Vocals || 
|-
|style="text-align:center;" rowspan="2"| 2007 || Broken Boy Soldiers (The Raconteurs)|| Best Rock Album || 
|-
| "Steady, as She Goes" (The Raconteurs) || Best Rock Performance by a Duo or Group with Vocal || 
|-
|style="text-align:center;" rowspan="3"| 2008 ||style="text-align:left;" rowspan="2"|"Icky Thump" (The White Stripes) || Best Rock Performance by a Duo or Group with Vocal || 
|-
| Best Rock Song || 
|-
| style="text-align:left;"| Icky Thump (The White Stripes) || Best Alternative Music Album || 
|-
| style="text-align:center;" rowspan="3"| 2009 || style="text-align:left;" rowspan="2"|Consolers of the Lonely (The Raconteurs)|| Best Rock Album || 
|-
| Best Engineered Non-Classical Album || 
|-
|style="text-align:left;" rowspan="1"|"Another Way to Die" (with Alicia Keys) (Jack White)|| Best Music Video || 
|-
|style="text-align:center;" rowspan="2"| 2011 || rowspan="2"| Under Great White Northern Lights (The White Stripes)|| Best Boxed or Special Limited Edition Package || 
|-
| Best Music Film || 
|-
|style="text-align:center;" rowspan="3"| 2013 ||style="text-align:left;" rowspan="2"|Blunderbuss (Jack White)|| Album of the Year || 
|-
| Best Rock Album || 
|-
| style="text-align:left;"| "Freedom at 21" (Jack White)|| Best Rock Song || 
|-
|style="text-align:center;" rowspan="2"| 2014 ||style="text-align:left;" rowspan="2"|"I'm Shakin" (Jack White)|| Best Rock Performance || 
|-
| Best Music Video || 
|-
|style="text-align:center;" rowspan="4"| 2015 ||style="text-align:left;" rowspan="2"|"Lazaretto" (Jack White)|| Best Rock Song || 
|-
| Best Rock Performance || 
|-
| Lazaretto (Jack White)|| Best Alternative Music Album || 
|-
| The Rise & Fall Of Paramount Records, Volume One (1917-27)(Susan Archie, Dean Blackwood & Jack White)
|  Best Boxed or Special Limited Edition Package 
| 
|-
|style="text-align:center;" rowspan="3"| 2016
|The Rise & Fall Of Paramount Records, Volume Two (1928-32)(Susan Archie, Dean Blackwood & Jack White)
| Best Boxed or Special Limited Edition Package
| 
|-
| "I Feel Love (Every Million Miles)" (The Dead Weather)
| Best Music Video 
|
|-
|My Happiness (Elvis Presley)
|Best Recording Package
| 
|-
|style="text-align:center;" rowspan="4"| 2017 ||style="text-align:left;" |Lemonade (Beyoncé)|| Album of the Year || 
|-
| "Don't Hurt Yourself (with Beyoncé)
| Best Rock Performance  
|
|-
| "City Lights"
| Best American Roots Song
| 
|-
| 
| The Recording Academy Producers & Engineers Wing President’s Merit Award
| 
|}

Hollywood Music in Media Awards

|-
| 2017
| The American Epic Sessions - "Two Fingers of Whiskey" - Bernie Taupin, Elton John, T Bone Burnett, Jack White
| Best Original Song - Documentary
|

Honorary Awards

Kerrang! Awards

|-
| 2003
| Elephant (The White Stripes)
| Best Album
|

Meteor Ireland Music Awards

|-
| 2004
| Elephant (The White Stripes)
| Best International Album
| 
|-
| 2006
| The White Stripes
| Best International Group
|

Mojo Magazine

|-
| 2006
| Broken Boy Soldiers (The Raconteurs)
| Album of the Year
|

MTV Europe Music Awards

|-
| style="text-align:center;" rowspan="1"| 2002 ||style="text-align:left;" rowspan="1"|"Fell In Love With A Girl" video (The White Stripes)|| Best Video || 
|-
|style="text-align:center;" rowspan="4"| 2003 ||style="text-align:left;" rowspan="2"|The White Stripes || Best Rock || 
|-
| Best Group || 
|-
| style="text-align:left;"| Elephant (The White Stripes)|| Best Album || 
|-
| "Seven Nation Army" video (The White Stripes)|| Best Video || 
|-
| style="text-align:center;" rowspan="1"| 2004 ||style="text-align:left;" rowspan="1"|"The Hardest Button to Button" video (The White Stripes)|| Best Video || 
|-
| style="text-align:center;" rowspan="1"| 2005 ||style="text-align:left;" rowspan="1"|The White Stripes || Best Alternative || 
|-
| style="text-align:center;" rowspan="1"| 2006 ||style="text-align:left;" rowspan="1"|The Raconteurs || Best Alternative || 
|-
| style="text-align:center;" rowspan="1"| 2007 ||style="text-align:left;" rowspan="1"|The White Stripes || Artist's Choice Award || 
|-
|style="text-align:center;" rowspan="2"| 2012 ||style="text-align:left;" rowspan="2"|Jack White || Best Alternative || 
|-
| Best Look || 
|}

MTV Video Music Awards

|-
| rowspan="4" | 2002
| rowspan="4" | Fell in Love with a Girl
| Video of the Year
| 
|-
| Breakthrough Video
| 
|-
| Best Special Effects (Special Effects: Twisted Labs and Sebastian Fau)
| 
|-
| Best Editing (Editors: Mikros and Duran)
| 
|-
|rowspan="4"| 2003
|rowspan="4"| "Seven Nation Army"
| Best Group Video
| 
|-
| Best Rock Video
| 
|-
| Best Special Effects (Special Effects: BUF)
| 
|-
| Best Editing (Editor: Olivier Gajan)
| 
|-
|rowspan="4"| 2004
|rowspan="4"| "The Hardest Button to Button"
| Breakthrough Video
| 
|-
| Best Direction (Directors: Michel Gondry)
| 
|-
| Best Special Effects (Special Effects: Richard de Carteret, Angus Kneale and Dirk Greene)
| 
|-
| Best Editing (Editor: Charlie Johnston, Geoff Hounsell and Andy Grieve)
| 
|-
|rowspan="3"| 2005
|rowspan="3"| "Blue Orchid"
| Best Direction (Directors: Floria Sigismondi)
| 
|-
| Best Art Direction (Art Director: Sue Tebbutt)
| 
|-
| Best Cinematography (Director of Photography: Chris Soos)
| 
|-
| 2007
| The White Stripes
| Best Group
| 
|-
|rowspan="2"| 2008
|rowspan="2"| "Conquest"
| Best Art Direction (Art Director: David Fitzpatrick)
| 
|-
| Best Cinematography (Director of Photography: Wyatt Troll)
| 
|-
| 2012
| "Sixteen Saltines"
| Best Rock Video
| 
|-
| 2014
| Lazaretto
| Best Visual Effects (Visual Effects: Mathematic and Jonas Francois)
| 
|-
| 2015
| Would You Fight for My Love?
| Best Art Direction (Art Director: Jeff Peterson)
| 
|-
| 2022
| Taking Me Back
| Best Rock Music Video
| 
|}

mtvU Woodie Awards

|-
| 2006
| "Steady, As She Goes" video (The Raconteurs)
| Best Live Action Video
| 
|-
| rowspan="2"| 2013
|rowspan="2"| Jack White
| FOMO Woodie
| 
|-
| Branching Out Woodie
|

MuchMusic Video Awards

|-
| 2002
| "Fell In Love With A Girl" video (The White Stripes)
| Best International Video: Group
| 
|-
| 2003
| "Seven Nation Army" video (The White Stripes)
| Best International Video: Group
|

Music Business Association

|-
| 2015
| Jack White
| Innovator Award
|

Music City Walk of Fame

|-
| 2015
| Jack White
| Inductee
|

NAMM Technical Excellence and Creativity Awards

|-
| 2015
| Lazaretto (Jack White)
| Outstanding Creative Achievement Record Production/Album
|

Nashville Songwriters Association International

|-
| 2014|2014
| Jack White
| Songwriter/Artist of the Year
|

NME Awards USA

|-
|rowspan="3"| 2008 || The White Stripes || Indie/Alternative Band of the Year || 
|-
| Icky Thump (The White Stripes) || Indie/Alternative Album of the Year || 
|-
| "Icky Thump" (The White Stripes) || Indie/Alternative Track || 
|-
| 2010
| The Dead Weather
| Best Live Event
|

O Music Awards

|-
| 2013
| Jack White
| Analog Genius Award
|

People's Choice Awards USA

|-
| 2009
| "Another Way To Die" (Jack White and Alicia Keys)
| Favorite Song from a Soundtrack
|

Q Awards

|-
| 2005
| "Blue Orchid" video (The White Stripes)
| Best Video
| 
|-
| 2007
| "Icky Thump" video (The White Stripes)
| Best Video
| 
|-
| rowspan="2"| 2009
| "Treat Me Like Your Mother" video (The Dead Weather)
| Best Video
| 
|-
| The Dead Weather
| Best New Act
| 
|-
| 2011
| Jack White
| Greatest Act of Last 25 Years
|

Satellite Awards

|-
| 2008
| "Another Way To Die" (Jack White and Alicia Keys)
| Best Original Song
|

Shockwaves NME Awards

|-
|rowspan="2"| 2002 ||rowspan="2"| The White Stripes || Best Band || 
|-
| Best New Act || 
|-
|rowspan="4"| 2004 || "Seven Nation Army" (The White Stripes) || Best Single || 
|-
| The White Stripes || Best International Band || 
|-
| Elephant (The White Stripes) || Best Album || 
|-
| "Hardest Button To Button" (The White Stripes) || Best Video || 
|-
|-
| 2005
| Live Under Blackpool Lights DVD (The White Stripes)
| Best Music DVD
|

Sweden GAFFA Awards
Delivered since 2010, the GAFFA Awards (Swedish: GAFFA Priset) are a Swedish award that rewards popular music awarded by the magazine of the same name.

!
|-
| 2019
| Himself
| Best Foreign Solo Act
| 
| style="text-align:center;" |
|-
|}

UK Music Video Awards

|-
| 2009
| "Treat Me Like Your Mother" video (The Dead Weather)
| Best Rock Video
| 
|-
| rowspan="2"| 2012
| "Two Against One" video (Danger Mouse feat. Jack White)
| Best Alternative Video - International
| 
|-
| "Sixteen Saltines" video (Jack White)
| Best Indie/Rock Video - International
|

References

White, Jack